Department of Land Records & Consolidation, Haryana is a Ministry and department of the Government of Haryana  in India.

Description
This department came into existence when Haryana was established as a new state within India after being separated from Punjab. Abhimanyu Sindhu is the cabinet minister responsible for this department from October 2014.

See also
 Government of Haryana

References

Land records and Consolidation
Land management in India